Cái Bè is a township and capital of Cái Bè District, Tiền Giang Province, Vietnam.

References

Populated places in Tiền Giang province
District capitals in Vietnam
Townships in Vietnam